Teufel Audio (referred to as Teufel) is a German manufacturer of audio products such as loudspeakers, headphones, hi-fi and home cinema systems.

History 
Teufel was founded in Berlin in 1979 by Peter Tschimmel. In the initial phase, the company produced and sold loudspeaker kits consisting of ready-made crossovers, drivers and cabinet components. The first products were loudspeaker sets.In 1990, Teufel changed its distribution model, from specialist and retail outlets to direct sales via catalogue. For the DVD launch in 1995, Teufel offered the THEATER 2, Europe's first 5.1 home cinema system with subwoofer, transverse centre and dipole rear speakers.

In 2006 private equity firm Riverside acquired Teufel from founder Peter Tschimmel. A year later. In 2010, private equity firm HgCapital acquired the company from Riverside. At the same time, Teufel integrated the Berlin-based start-up Raumfeld, which had been developing and selling multi-room streaming speakers since 2008. In summer 2018, French private equity company Naxicap took over the company. Since March 2020, Sascha Mallah has led the company as sole Managing Director.

Locations and distribution 
Development, marketing, sales, administration and the flagship store in Bikini Berlin and the Teufel Shop in KaDeWe are located in Berlin. In Germany and Austria there are also other Teufel stores. In addition, Teufel's Chinese agency is located in Dongguan/China with a total of 48 employees who take care of supply management and sales. Warehousing and logistics are handled in Hamburg.

Products 

Teufel's product range includes various audio and Hi-fi categories, active and passive stereo speakers, home cinema speakers and systems, streaming speakers and systems, Soundbars and sound decks, Bluetooth speakers, headphones, including (wireless) in-ears, PC and multimedia speakers.

Website links 

 Teufel history
 Teufel blog

References 

Loudspeaker manufacturers
Audio equipment manufacturers of Germany
Manufacturing companies based in Berlin